Seamon is a surname. Notable people with the surname include:

Billy Seamon (1917–1992), American bridge player
D. Omer Seamon (1911–1997), American painter
Edith Seamon (1911–2011), American bridge player
Greg Seamon (born 1955), American football coach
Michael Seamon (1960–2017), American bridge player
Mike Seamon (born 1988), American soccer player

See also
Janice Seamon-Molson (born 1956), American bridge player